18S ribosomal RNA (abbreviated 18S rRNA) is a part of the ribosomal RNA. The S in 18S represents Svedberg units. 18S rRNA is an SSU rRNA, a component of the  eukaryotic ribosomal small subunit  (40S). 18S rRNA is the structural RNA for the small component of eukaryotic cytoplasmic ribosomes, and thus one of the basic components of all eukaryotic cells.

18S rRNA is the eukaryotic cytosolic homologue of 16S ribosomal RNA in prokaryotes and plastids. 18S rRNA is also a homologue of 12S ribosomal RNA in mitochondria.

The genes coding for 18S rRNA are referred to as 18S rRNA genes. Sequence data from these genes is widely used in molecular analysis to reconstruct the evolutionary history of organisms, especially in vertebrates, as its slow evolutionary rate makes it suitable to reconstruct ancient divergences.

Uses in phylogeny 
The small subunit (SSU) 18S rRNA gene is one of the most frequently used genes in phylogenetic studies and an important marker for random target polymerase chain reaction (PCR) in environmental biodiversity screening. In general, rRNA gene sequences are easy to access due to highly conserved flanking regions allowing for the use of universal primers. Their repetitive arrangement within the genome provides excessive amounts of template DNA for PCR, even in the smallest organisms. The 18S gene is part of the ribosomal functional core and is exposed to similar selective forces in all living beings. Thus, when the first large-scale phylogenetic studies based on 18S sequences were published (e.g. by Field et al., 1988), the gene was celebrated as the prime candidate for reconstructing the metazoan tree of life. 18S sequences later provided evidence for the splitting of Ecdysozoa and Lophotrochozoa clades (monophyletic group of organisms composed of a common ancestor and all its lineal descendants), thus contributing to the most recent revolutionary change in our understanding of metazoan relationships.

During the latter part of the 2000s, and with increased numbers of taxa included into molecular phylogenies, however, two problems became apparent.  First, there are prevailing sequencing impediments in representatives of certain taxa, such as the mollusk classes Solenogastres and Tryblidia, selected bivalve taxa, and the enigmatic crustacean class Remipedia. Failure to obtain 18S sequences of single taxa is considered a common phenomenon but is rarely ever reported.  Secondly, in contrast to initially high hopes, 18S cannot resolve nodes at all taxonomic levels and its efficacy varies considerably among clades. This has been discussed as an effect of rapid ancient radiation within short periods. Multigene analyses are currently thought to give more reliable results for tracing deep branching events in Metazoa but 18S still is extensively used in phylogenetic analyses.

References 
This article incorporates CC-By-2.0 text from the reference.

Ribosomal RNA